Tarik Ibrahimagic (born 23 January 2001) is a Danish professional footballer who plays as a midfielder for Danish 1st Division club Næstved Boldklub.

Club career

OB
Ibrahimagic played as a youth for OKS, before joining OB as a under-14 player. Ibrahimagic went on a training camp with OB's first team squad in the winter 2020 in Turkey and was subsequently included in the first-team squad the first two Superliga matches. He got his official debut for OB on 1 June 2020 against AGF in the Danish Superliga. Ibrahimagic started on the bench, before replacing Oliver Lund in the 80th minute.

After a good season with 18 games for OB's U19 team - who won the 2019/20 U19 league - Ibrahimagic signed his first two-year professional contract on 11 May 2020, which also included a permanent promotion to the first team squad.

On 22 April 2022 it was confirmed, that Ibrahimagic was one out of a few players, that would leave the club at the end of the season, due to the expiration of their contracts.

Næstved
On 9 June 2022, Ibrahimagic joined Danish 1st Division side Næstved Boldklub.

International career
Born in Denmark, Ibrahimagic is of Bosnian descent through his father. He is a youth international for Denmark, having represented the Denmark U19s.

References

External links
 

2001 births
Living people
Danish men's footballers
Danish people of Bosnia and Herzegovina descent
Denmark youth international footballers
Association football midfielders
Footballers from Odense
Danish Superliga players
Odense Kammeraternes Sportsklub players
Odense Boldklub players
Næstved Boldklub players